Enmanuel Reyes (born 14 December 1992) is a Spanish amateur boxer. He competed in the men's heavyweight event at the 2020 Summer Olympics.

Born in Cuba, he arrived in Spain in 2017 and became a naturalized citizen in 2020.

References

External links
 

1992 births
Living people
Spanish male boxers
Olympic boxers of Spain
Boxers at the 2020 Summer Olympics
AIBA World Boxing Championships medalists
Boxers from Havana
Naturalised citizens of Spain
Spanish people of Cuban descent
Sportspeople from A Coruña
Mediterranean Games competitors for Spain
Competitors at the 2022 Mediterranean Games